Johnathon Banks is an American former professional boxer who competed from 2004 to 2014. He held the IBO cruiserweight title from 2008 to 2009 and challenged once for the IBF cruiserweight title in 2009. He currently works as a boxing trainer, most notably for former heavyweight champion Wladimir Klitschko, and was himself trained by the late Emanuel Steward. He is currently coaching Gennady Golovkin as well as Badou Jack.

Amateur career
Prior to turning professional, Banks enjoyed a successful amateur career that saw him become a three-time National Amateur Champion at 178 lbs.

Professional career
He fought out of the Kronk Gym in Detroit.

Banks became the NABO Cruiserweight Champion, knocking out Eliseo Castillo in the fourth round.

After victories over Derrick Brown (13-3-3) and Imamu Mayfield (25-8-2) Banks lined himself up for a title clash for the IBO Cruiserweight title.

IBO Cruiserweight Championship
On July 12 Banks fought Vincenzo Rossitto for the vacant IBO Cruiserweight Championship, Johnathon won by a majority decision.

IBF Cruiserweight Championship
He then fought Tomasz Adamek for the IBF Cruiserweight Championship title on February 27 in Newark, NJ at the Prudential Center. Banks was unsuccessful and was knocked out in the eighth round.

WBC Heavyweight Semi-Final Eliminator
Banks was set to fight undefeated prospect Seth Mitchell on November 17, 2012 in Atlantic City. He defeated Seth Mitchell by a second-round knockout. In a 2013 rematch, however, Banks dropped a unanimous decision to Mitchell.

Work as a trainer
After the death of Emmanuel Steward, Banks assumed the role of head trainer of world  heavyweight champion Wladimir Klitschko.
In July 2015 he replaced Chris Okoh as Dillian Whyte's trainer after the latter got injured. As of May 4 of 2019, Gennady Golovkin introduced Banks as his new head coach.

Professional boxing record

References

https://anchor.fm/vkopod/episodes/Send-In-The-Clowns-e12ivdb

External links
 
 Johnathon Banks' Official Website
 The Official Website of the Kronk Gym

|-

|-

Year of birth missing (living people)
Living people
African-American boxers
Sportspeople from Southfield, Michigan
Boxers from Michigan
Heavyweight boxers
Cruiserweight boxers
American male boxers
American boxing trainers
21st-century African-American sportspeople
20th-century African-American people